John Harris (born 3 April 1939) is an English former professional footballer who played as a full back. He played in the Football League for Wolverhampton Wanderers and Walsall.

Career
Harris joined Wolverhampton Wanderers in 1955 as a junior. He signed professional forms in May 1958, and made his senior debut on 26 August 1961 in a 3–2 win against West Ham United. He made a total of 3 appearances in the Football League for Wolves.

In January 1965, Harris moved to Midlands neighbours Walsall. He made 74 league appearances, - many as captain - in the Third Division for the Saddlers, before he dropped into non-league football with Rushall Olympic.

References

1939 births
Living people
English footballers
Wolverhampton Wanderers F.C. players
Walsall F.C. players
Rushall Olympic F.C. players
English Football League players
Association football defenders